The women's individual pursuit at the 2011 Dutch National Track Championships in Apeldoorn took place at Omnisport Apeldoorn on December 28, 2011. 14 athletes participated in the contest.

Ellen van Dijk won the gold medal, Kirsten Wild took silver and Amy Pieters won the bronze.

Preview
Ellen van Dijk, the national champion of 2007, 2008 and 2010 was top favourite for this discipline.

Competition format
The tournament started with a qualifying round. The two fastest qualifiers advanced to the gold medal final. The numbers three and four competed against each other for the bronze medal.

Race
Ellen van Dijk was as well in the qualification round as in the final the fastes and became, after being ascent in 2009, for the 4th time in 5 years national champion in the individual pursuit. Kirsten Wild took the silver medal and Amy Pieters won the bronze.

Results

Qualification
The qualification round started at 17:30.

Finals
The finals started at 19:40.
Bronze medal match

Gold medal match

Final results

Results from nkbaanwielrennen.nl.

References

2011 Dutch National track cycling championships
Dutch National Track Championships – Women's individual pursuit
Dutch